The Pratt & Whitney F135 is an afterburning turbofan developed for the Lockheed Martin F-35 Lightning II, a single-engine strike fighter. It has two variants; a Conventional Take-Off and Landing (CTOL) variant used in the F-35A and F-35C, and a two-cycle Short Take-Off Vertical Landing (STOVL) variant used in the F-35B  that includes a forward lift fan. The first production engines were delivered in 2009.

Developed from the Pratt & Whitney F119 engine used on the F-22 Raptor, the F135 produces around 43,000 lbf (191 kN) of thrust. The F135 competed with the General Electric/Rolls-Royce F136 to power the F-35.

Development
The F135 originated with Lockheed Corporation Skunk Works, with efforts to develop a stealthy STOVL strike fighter for the U.S. Marine Corps under a 1986 DARPA program. Lockheed employee Paul Bevilaqua developed and patented a concept aircraft and propulsion system, and then turned to Pratt & Whitney (P&W) to build a demonstrator engine. The ground test demonstrator used the first stage fan from a F119 engine for the lift fan. The engine fan and core from the F100-220 were used for the core of the demonstrator engine, and the larger low-pressure turbine from the F100-229 was used for the low-pressure turbine of the demonstrator engine. The larger turbine was used to provide the additional power required to operate the lift fan. Finally, a variable thrust deflecting nozzle was added to complete the "F100-229-Plus" demonstrator engine. This engine proved the lift-fan concept and led to the development of the current F135 engine.

The F135 team is made up of Pratt & Whitney, Rolls-Royce and Hamilton Sundstrand.  Pratt & Whitney is the prime contractor for the main engine, and systems integration.  Rolls-Royce is responsible for the vertical lift system for the STOVL aircraft. Hamilton Sundstrand is responsible for the electronic engine control system, actuation system, PMAG, gearbox, and health monitoring systems.  Woodward, Inc. is responsible for the fuel system.

P&W developed the F135 from their F119 turbofan, which powers the F-22 Raptor, as the "F119-JSF". The F135 integrates the F119 core with new components optimized for the JSF.  The F135 is assembled at a plant in Middletown, Connecticut.  Some parts of the engine are made in Longueuil, Quebec, Canada, and in Poland.

The first production propulsion system for operational service was scheduled for delivery in 2007 with the purpose of serving the U.S., UK, and other international customers. The initial F-35s went into production with the F135 engines, but the GE/Rolls-Royce team planned to develop a replacement F136 engine in July 2009. In 2010, the Pentagon planned for the two propulsion systems to be competitively tendered. However, since 2006 the Defense Department has not requested funding for the alternate F136 engine program, but Congress has maintained program funding.

As of 2009, P&W developed a more durable version of the F135 engine to increase the service life of key parts. The life expectancy of the parts was reduced because the hot sections of the engine (combustor and high-pressure turbine blades specifically) ran hotter than expected. The test engine is designated XTE68/LF1, and testing is expected to begin in 2010. This redesign has caused “substantial cost growth.”

P&W expects to deliver the F135 below the cost of the F119, even though it is a more powerful engine. However, in February 2013 a cracked turbine blade was found during a scheduled inspection. The crack was caused by operating at high turbine temperatures for longer periods than usual. In December 2013 the hollow first stage fan blisk failed at 77% of its expected life during a ground test. It will be replaced by a solid part adding  in weight. In 2013, a former P&W employee was caught attempting to ship "numerous boxes" of sensitive information about the F135 to Iran.

Despite the troubles, the 100th engine was delivered in 2013. LRIP-6 was agreed in 2013 for $1.1 billion for 38 engines of various types, which helped to decrease the unit cost.

Air Force Lt. Gen. Christopher C. Bogdan, the executive officer of the F-35 program, has called out P&W for falling short on manufacturing quality of the engines and slow deliveries. His deputy director Rear Admiral Randy Mahr said that P&W stopped their cost-cutting efforts after "they got the monopoly". In 2013 the price of the F135 increased by $4.3 billion.

In May 2014, Pratt & Whitney discovered conflicting documentation about the origin of titanium material used in some of its engines, including the F135. The company assessed that the uncertainty did not pose a risk to safety of flight but suspended engine deliveries as a result. Bogdan supported P&W's actions and said the problem was now with A&P Alloys, the supplier. The US Defense Contract Management Agency wrote in June 2014 that Pratt & Whitney's "continued poor management of suppliers is a primary driver for the increased potential problem notifications." A&P Alloys stated that they stood behind their product even though they were not given access to the parts to do their own testing. Tracy Miner, an attorney with Boston-based Demeo LLP representing A&P Alloys said, "it is blatantly unfair to destroy A&P’s business without allowing A&P access to the materials in question"

In July 2014 there was an uncontained failure of a fan rotor while the aircraft was preparing for take-off. The parts passed through a fuel tank and caused a fire, grounding the F-35 fleet. During high g-force maneuvering three weeks before the flight, flexing of the engine caused excessive rubbing at the seal between the fan blisk and the fan stator initiating the impending failure. The rub caused a temperature of over 1,000 °C (1,900 °F), well beyond the material limit of 540 °C (1,000 °F). Micro cracks appeared in third-stage fan blades, according to program manager Christopher Bogdan, causing blades to separate from the disk. The failed blades punctured the fuel cell and hot air mixing with jet fuel caused the fire. As a short term fix, each aircraft is flown on a specific flight profile to allow the rotor seal to wear a mating groove in the stator to prevent excessive rubbing.

Pratt & Whitney managed to meet their 2015 production goals, but "recurring manufacturing quality issues" in turbine blades and electronic control systems required engines to be pulled from the fleet.

Design

Derived from the F119 engine, the F135 is a mixed-flow afterburning turbofan with a new fan and LP turbine.

There are two F135 variants: the -100 and the -600 versions.  A -400 version is mentioned, similar to the -100, the main difference being the use of salt-corrosion resistant materials. The -600 is described below with an explanation of the engine configuration changes that take place for hovering. The engine and Rolls-Royce LiftSystem make up the Integrated Lift Fan Propulsion System (ILFPS).

The vertical thrust for the STOVL version is obtained from a two-stage lift fan (about 46%) in front of the engine, a vectoring exhaust nozzle (about 46%), and a nozzle in each wing using fan air from the bypass duct (about 8%).

In this configuration most of the bypass flow is ducted to the wing nozzles, known as roll posts. Some is used for cooling the rear exhaust nozzle, known as the 3-bearing swivel duct nozzle (3BSD). At the same time an auxiliary inlet is opened on top of the aircraft to provide additional air to the engine with low distortion during the hover.

The low pressure (LP) turbine drives the lift fan through a shaft extension on the front of the LP rotor and a clutch. The engine operates as a separate flow turbofan with a higher bypass ratio. The power to drive the fan—about —is obtained from the LP turbine by increasing the hot nozzle area.

A higher bypass ratio increases the thrust for the same engine power as a fundamental consequence of transferring power from a small diameter propelling jet to a larger diameter one. When the F135 is providing vertical lift using the increased bypass ratio from the lift fan, the thrust augmentation is 50% with no increase in fuel flow. Thrust augmentation is 52% in conventional flight when using the afterburner, but with a large increase in fuel flow.

Like the F119, the F135 has a stealthy augmentor where traditional spray bars and flameholders are replaced by thick curved vanes coated with ceramic radar-absorbent materials (RAM). Afterburner fuel injectors are integrated into these vanes, which block line-of-sight of the turbines, contributing to aft-sector stealth. The axisymmetric nozzle consists of fifteen partially overlapping flaps that create a sawtooth pattern at the trailing edge. This creates shed vortices and reduces the infrared signature of the exhaust plume. The effectiveness is reportedly comparable to that of the F119's wedge nozzles, while being substantially more cost effective and lower maintenance.

The engine uses thermoelectric-powered sensors to monitor turbine bearing health.

Improving engine reliability and ease of maintenance is a major objective for the F135. The engine has fewer parts than similar engines, which improves reliability. All line-replaceable components (LRCs) can be removed and replaced with a set of six common hand tools. The F135's health management system is designed to provide real time data to maintainers on the ground. This allows them to troubleshoot problems and prepare replacement parts before the aircraft returns to base. According to Pratt & Whitney, this data may help drastically reduce troubleshooting and replacement time, as much as 94% over legacy engines.

Planned improvements
Although no service has issued a requirement for an upgraded engine, Pratt and Whitney is cooperating with the US Navy on a two-block improvement plan for the F135 engine. The goals of Block 1 are a 7–10% increase in thrust and a 5–7% lower fuel burn. The plans include better cooling technology for turbine blades; this would increase the longevity of the engine and substantially reduce maintenance costs. The goal of Block 2 is to work with the US Air Force's Adaptive Engine Transition Program, with the intention of introducing technology for an engine rated at 45,000 lb of thrust, to be used in a sixth-generation fighter.

Growth Options

GO1
At the end of May 2017 Pratt and Whitney announced the F135 Growth Option 1 had finished testing and was available for production. The upgrade requires the changing of the power module on older engines and can be seamlessly inserted into future production engines at a minimal increase in unit cost and no impact to delivery schedule. The Growth Option 1 offers an improvement of 6-10% thrust across the F-35 flight envelope while also getting a 5-6% fuel burn reduction.

GO2
In June 2018, United Technologies, parent company of P&W, announced Growth Option 2.0 to help provide increased power and thermal management system (PTMS) capacity, providing options for operators for instance if they are wishing to upgrade to heavier weapons.

Variants
 F135-PW-100: Used in the F-35A Conventional Take-Off and Landing (CTOL) variant
 F135-PW-400: Used in the F-35C naval variant built with salt-corrosion resistant materials
 F135-PW-600: Used in the F-35B Short Take-Off Vertical Landing variant

Applications
 Lockheed Martin F-35 Lightning II
 Northrop Grumman B-21 Raider (modified variant)

Specifications (F135)

F135-PW-100

F135-PW-600

See also

References

Bibliography

 
 Jane's Information Group. Pratt & Whitney F135. Jane's Aero Engines. Modified 10 July 2009.

External links

 Pratt & Whitney F135 page
 www.jsf.mil: F135 gallery

Low-bypass turbofan engines
F135
2000s turbofan engines